In organic chemistry, the term ethynyl designates a functional group with a double bond with 2 carbon atoms both with 
sp hybridisation and a triple bond(1 sigma and 2 pi bond) . It is a species similar to acetylene (or in IUPAC ethyne ) with a less H atom thus joined to root chain.

 An ethynyl group (HC≡C–), also designated as acetylenic group (from acetylene), and referred to in IUPAC chemical nomenclature as -yne suffix. Also sometimes designed as ethinyl in compounds (ethinylestradiol, ethisterone (ethinyltestosterone)). See main page alkynes.
 The ethynyl radical (HC≡C·), the compound found in interstellar medium, and transiently on earth during chemical reactions.
 The ethynyl carbanion Acetylide (HC≡C−)

See also 
 Ethynylation
 Propynyl ( H3C–C≡C–R, 1-propynyl group; or HC≡C–CH2–R, 2-propynyl group, Propargyl )

Alkynyl groups